Dirty District was a French fusion band, formed in 1985. They were one of the first French bands to attempt fusion rock.

Early years
The band originally formed in  Sèvres, France under the name of Great Gangsters from the Dirty District (until they changed it to just Dirty District later). A vast majority of their songs were sung in English, except for the first EP and two songs on Pousse au crime et Longueurs de temps. Influenced by the likes of Joe Jackson, The Clash, Stiff Little Fingers, Linton Kwesi Johnson, Reggae, Ska and Rhythm and blues. They released the much delayed Pousse au crime et Longueurs de temps which were a fusion of reggae, ska, punk, dub, and rap with heavily political based lyrics based on street crime, Steve Biko and fighting the National Front. Pousse Au Crime.. was noticed by fellow French Punk/World Music band Mano Negra, and the band invited them to play on their album Patchanka.

1993 and onwards

After a whole host of musicians had been and gone, Dirty District finally got a steady line-up  when they released their second album Life in the Dirty District in 1993. DD showed their eclectic roots yet again on this album, experimenting with elements of Rap Metal. During this time Kshoo, Philippe, Miguel and Charlu from 'Ludwig Von 88' started a little-known side project called Les Dieux (The Gods). After taking 2 years off (most members like Yvo, Philippe, Miguel had been contributing to other French musicians) Dirty District released the final EP Welcome to the Next Level in 1995, which included a cover of The Prodigy's Jericho, and the song Speech Over which explored the sound that would later explode in Ethnician. The band disbanded in 1996. Vocalist K-Shoo went on to do co-vocals for metalcore group Boost and then formed another metalcore/punk-metal band called Noxious Enjoyment while Yvo nowadays plays live drums for Amadou & Mariam, Philippe is a London-based musician and producer, and bassist Leuji has now his own musical career, and performs in a band of the same name.

Members
 K-shoo: Kshoo is the vocalist and live guitarist. He also contributed vocals to Death Metal Band Boost and Punk supergroups Les Dieux, and finally his metalcore band Noxious Enjoyment.
 Yvo Abadi (aka 'The Megasound') is the drummer and percussionist, who joined in 1993. Since leaving DD, Yvo has contributed drums and percussions to other artists. Was last seen playing drums at Glastonbury 2009 with Amadou & Mariam.
 Philippe Lenzini (also known as Ifif) was the guitarist after Gille's departure. He played on the Life in the Dirty District and Welcome to the Next Level. He lives in London, has played and collaborated with various musicians including Youth, Dennis Morris, Klima, and has also been writing music for film.
 Miguel Saboga is the second drummer and percussionist. He started drumming in The Brigades, and later does vocals on Dirty District's song "No Head", which led to him becoming the frontman of Ethnician.
 Igor Nikitinsky is the sampler and keyboards player. He replaced Geo and also is in Ethnician.
 Garbis Baharian did most of the sample and sound engineering on the first album, and also is in Ethnician.

Former members

 Gilles Vidal was the guitarist on first album. His spot was filled by two other guitarists, who were later replaced by Philippe.
 Geo was the keyboardist on the two first albums. 
 Fred was the bassist on the first album.

Discography
 Great Gangsters From The Dirty District EP (1989)
 Pousse au crime et Longueurs de temps (1991)
 Life In The Dirty District (1993)
 Welcome To The Next Level EP (1995)

They also appear on the French punk rock compilations À Bas Toutes Les Armées  with Reggae tune Paddy Field, and Cette Machine Sert A Tuer Tous Les Fascistes ('This Machine Is Used To Kill All The Fascists') with anti racism song Blast it and more recently Rap Metal Masters with NY Crap.

External links
The Great Gangsters webpage
DD on Myspace
mp3 of the prodigy cover

Musical groups from Île-de-France
French punk rock groups
Reggae fusion albums